Aroga mesostrepta is a moth of the family Gelechiidae first described by Edward Meyrick in 1932. It is found in Japan, the Russian Far East and Korea.

References

Moths described in 1932
Aroga
Moths of Asia